The Africa Scout Region is the divisional office of the World Scout Bureau of the World Organization of the Scout Movement, headquartered in Nairobi, Kenya, with satellite offices in Cape Town, South Africa, and Dakar, Senegal. The Africa Region services Scouting in Sub-Saharan Africa and neighboring islands that are recognized members of the World Organization of the Scout Movement (WOSM). Currently, the region has 39 member National Scout Associations/Organizations and 11 potential members. There are about one million registered Scouts in Africa, though it is suspected that there are about twice that number in the region. The large nations of Mali, Guinea-Bissau and the Central African Republic, and several smaller nations, are not yet WOSM members, for various reasons.

This region is the counterpart of the Africa Region of the World Association of Girl Guides and Girl Scouts (WAGGGS).

History 
On 13 March 1963, Scout leaders from around the region met for the first time in Lagos, Nigeria to discuss the organization of the Africa Scout Region. At the 62nd ordinary session of the Council of Ministers of the Organization of African Unity meeting in Addis Ababa, Ethiopia on 21-23 June 1995, declared 13 March the Africa Scout Day.

Africa Network Scout Fellowship
The Africa Network Scout Fellowship is a forum where members of the United Kingdom Scout Association with a specific interest in Africa can share knowledge, ideas and experiences. It promotes the expansion of international Scouting, with a particular focus on building friendships in the countries of sub-Saharan Africa. Collectively the Africa Network Scout Fellowship members have experience in Angola, Botswana, Cameroon, Gambia, Ghana, Kenya, Malawi, Namibia, Nigeria, Seychelles, Sierra Leone, South Africa, Tanzania, Uganda, Zambia and Zimbabwe.

The Africa Network Scout Fellowship assists all sections of the Scout Movement, in a variety of activities-whitewater rafting, community initiatives, mountaineering, construction projects and safari adventures.

The Africa Network Scout Fellowship actively promotes expeditions to all parts of sub-Saharan Africa, and help on all aspects of an expedition, from initial planning, to British training camps, to the actual expedition itself. Africa Network Scout Fellowship meetings are held at varying locations throughout the United Kingdom.

All-Africa Region Scout Jamborees

The Region has run or sponsored region-wide jamborees in its member countries. Past Jamborees include:
 1st All-Africa Jamboree- Shere Hills, Jos Nigeria-1976
 2nd All-Africa Jamboree- Kaazi, Uganda-1989
 3rd All-Africa Jamboree- Ghana-1994
 4th All-Africa Jamboree- Rowallan Scout Camp and Jamhuri Park in Nairobi, Kenya - August 9 to 19, 2000
 5th All-Africa Jamboree- Catembe, Mozambique-July 21 to 31, 2006
 6th Africa Scout Jamboree 2012- Bungere, Burundi-July 28 to August 5, 2012

The 1st "Africa Rover Moot", hosted by the Kenya Scouts Association, is scheduled to take place in April 2023.

See also
 Frederick Russell Burnham
 Rubina Marivonne Haroon
 Kinuthia Murugu

References

External links
 Africa Network Scout Fellowship
 Africa Jamboree to be held in Mozambique

!Africa